Najm ad-Dīn Kubrà was a 13th-century Khwarezmian Sufi from Khwarezm and the founder of the Kubrawiya, influential in the Ilkhanate and Timurid dynasty. His method, exemplary of a "golden age" of Sufi metaphysics, was related to the Illuminationism of Shahab al-Din Yahya ibn Habash Suhrawardi as well as to Rumi's Shams Tabrizi.  Kubra was born in 540/1145 and died in 618/1221.

Biography 

Born in 540/1145 in Konye-Urgench, Najmuddin Kubra began his career as a scholar of hadith and kalam. His interest in Sufism began in Egypt where he became a murid of Ruzbihan Baqli, who was an initiate of the Uwaisi. After years of study, he abandoned his exploration of the religious sciences and devoted himself entirely to the Sufi way of life.

Sufi sheikh Zia al-Din-'Ammar Bitlisi was Kubra's teacher, who tried to present Sufi thought in a new way to provide contemplation and influence for the reader. After receiving his khirka, Kubra gained a large following of gnostics and writers on Sufism.

Because his followers were predominantly Sufi writers and gnostics, Kubra was given the title "manufacturer of saints" (in Persian: vali tarash) and his order was named the Kubrawiya.

Kubra's main body of works concerns the analysis of the visionary experience. He wrote numerous important works discussing the visionary experience, including a Sufi commentary on the Quran that he was unable to complete due to his death in 618/1221. Kubra died during the Mongol invasion and massacre after refusing to leave his city, where he fought in hand-to-hand combat against the Mongols.

Overall, Kubra is remembered as a pioneer of the Sufi tradition and explanation of spiritual visionary experiences. Kubra's work spread throughout the Middle East and Central Asia where it flourished for many years, until it gradually was taken over by other similar more popular ideologies and Sufi leaders.

His Work 

In addition to his work centering on the Sufi commentary of the Qu'ran, Kubra wrote other important treatises including:

 Fawa'ih al-djamal wa-fawatih al-djalal
 Usul al-'ashara
 Risalat al-kha'if al-ha'im min lawmat al-la'im

His works discuss the analysis of dreams and visions, such as the "significance of dreams and visions, the degrees of luminous epiphany that are manifested to the mystic, the different classes of concept and image that engage his attention, and the nature and interrelations of man's 'subtle centres.'" The interpretation and understanding of dreams was important because Muhammad had developed the Islamic faith based on dreams and visions, so the Qu'ran was seen as a visionary text. The Kubrawiya order were avid practitioners of seeking the meaning of visions through ritual performances and meditation. Kubra, being the manufacturer of saints, led him to analyze popular dream episodes from Muslim hagiographical works, and his disciples would follow in his analysis of these well known and important works.

The Kubrawiyah Order 

The Kubrawiya was Kubra's Sufi order, focusing on explaining the visionary experience. The influence of the Kubrawiya can be seen on the Islamic world as a whole because of its relationship to the strong influence of Shi'ism in Iran.  The Kubrawiya was not largely popular until after Kubra's death in the 13th century. The Kubrawiya found great development outside of Central Asia, but its influence and presence only lasted till the 15th/16th century, when it was overshadowed by the Naqshbandiya (another, more attractive Sufi group) during the Ottoman Empire, though a nominal following continued on.  Before this occurred, the order split after the leadership of Isḥāḳ al-Khuttalānī (d. 1423) into the Nurbakshiyya and the Dhahabiyya.  The former were eventually persecuted under the Safavids in the later 16th century, whereas the latter survives presently with Shiraz as its centre.

The Kubrawiya's influence in Central Asia established many political, social, and economic activities there, but the Naqshbandiyah developed these ideas to their fullest potential. The Kubrawiya's main teaching was a "well-developed mystical psychology based on the analysis of the visionary experience." They focused on explaining the spiritual visionary experiences that Sufis underwent in everyday life. Their largest concern was the total focus on the zikr as a means of allowing for the perception of spiritual visions.

The Firdausi Kubrawi order was popularized in Bihar and Bengal region of India by Makhdoom Sharfuddin Ahmed Yahya Maneri Hashmi who is buried in Biharsharif. The branch Firdausia's linage from Najmuddin Kubra is through his disciple Saif ed-Din al-Boharsi through Sheikh Badruddin Samarqandi through Sheikh Ruknuddin Firdausi through Sheikh Najeeduddin Firdausi of Mehrauli, Delhi, who was Makhdoom Sheikh Sharafuddin Ahmad Yahya Maneri Hashmi's peer.

His disciples 
Among his twelve students one can mention Najmeddin Razi, Sayfeddin Bakhezri, Majd al-Dīn Baghdādī, Ali ibn lala ghznavi and Baha'uddin Walad, father of Jalaluddin Rumi. However, one of his most well-known and influential disciples though was Sa'd al-Din Hamuwayi. Kubra informed Hamuwayi to leave the city in which they resided with the impending Mongol invasion on the horizon. However, Hamuwayi stayed with Kubra and received his ijaza from him, which shows his favorable reputation with the Sufi Master, as not only a student, but as a friend. Hamuwayi wrote over thirty important manuscripts and other works concerning the work of Kubra, and the influence of the Kubrawiyah.

Pan-religious similarities 
Today, the practices of the Kubrawiyya are similar to certain yoga practices (Tibetan and other sadhana), wherein the practitioners focus on prayer, fasting, seclusion, and entry into visionary states. Although the focus on visionary states can lead to infer that the practice of yoga could be attributed to the influence of the Kubrawiyah, and although mutual influences have taken place between Sufism and Indian yoga practice, there is no evidence of a direct influence of Kubrawiyya on Hatha Yoga which is contemporary (tenth to eleventh century CE). Experience of visions and colours which are systematically studied by Kubra, have close counterparts in yoga treatises (Hatha yoga pradipika, Gheranda Samhita, etc.). Kubra said "the mystical traveller will similarly sense the generation of lights from the whole of his body and the veil will possibly be withdrawn from the entire selfhood, so that with all of the body you will see the All!" The physical action of yoga will help one to see the All (God) through dreams, visions, and experiences. In a modern attempt to explain the connection of the divine through yoga, they attribute another quote of Kubra saying "The light that is derived from God's lights and witnessed by the heart serves to make God known to the heart: He makes Himself known by means of Himself." These two groups show similar spiritual experiences such as total isolation which invokes a connection with the divine seen in accounts by both parties. Even though, there are numerous similarities between the mystical experiences achieved through yoga and those achieved by various Sufi practices, it is not a fact that connection between these two groups can be attributed to the spread of the Kubrawiyah's ideologies in the 15th century, but rather that mutual influences have taken place via Kashmir and other northern parts of India, and via Bengal where the two - Sufism and hinduist yoga - are proven to have been in contact, and still are influencing each other today (cf. the Baul movement).

See also

 List of Persian scientists and scholars
 Henry Corbin
 Ruzbihan Baqli
 Seyyed Qutb al-Din Mohammad Neyrizi

References

1221 deaths
13th-century philosophers
Islamic philosophers
Iranian Sufis
Sufi poets
Kubrawiya order
Oveyssi order
12th-century Iranian people
Iranian Sufi religious leaders
People from Daşoguz Region
Year of birth unknown
13th-century Iranian people
Founders of Sufi orders